Apagomerina jucunda is a species of beetle in the family Cerambycidae. It was described by Martins and Galileo in 1984. It is known from Brazil.

References

jucunda
Beetles described in 1984